Nida Karasakal is a Turkish olympic weightlifter. She competed in the Weightlifting at the 2018 Summer Youth Olympics, winning the bronze medal in the girls' 44 kg event.

References

External links 

Living people
Place of birth missing (living people)
Year of birth missing (living people)
Turkish female weightlifters
Weightlifters at the 2018 Summer Youth Olympics
Medalists at the 2018 Summer Youth Olympics
21st-century Turkish sportswomen